Life After People is a television series on which scientists, mechanical engineers, and other experts speculate about what might become of planet Earth if humanity suddenly disappeared. The featured experts also talk about the impact of human absence on the environment and the vestiges of civilization thus left behind. The series was preceded by a two-hour special that aired on January 21, 2008, on the History Channel which served as a de facto pilot for the series that premiered April 21, 2009. The documentary and subsequent series were both narrated by James Lurie.

Format
The program does not speculate on how humanity may disappear, stipulating only that it has, and that it has done so suddenly, leaving everything behind including household pets and livestock that have to fend for themselves. The thought experiment is based on documented results of the sudden removal of humans from a geographical area and thus, the discontinuation of the maintenance of buildings and urban infrastructure. Lurie's narration begins:

The series' episodes thematically offer examples of urban and biological decay. The focus is on specific locations such as skyscrapers, religious icons, bridges and dams, and government buildings, and the fate of certain related objects, such as artifacts, documents and human bodies. The fate of some kinds of flora and fauna are covered as well. Each episode also contains a segment in which experts examine real locations that have been abandoned by people, including ghost towns and other sites of deterioration, where the deterioration has been caused by events similar to those outlined in the episode. Although the series speculates on the fates of landmarks around the world, the main focus is on situations that may occur at locations in the United States.

The various events that may occur after people disappear suddenly are depicted using CGI dramatizations. The timeline of predicted events begins approximately one day after the disappearance of humankind and extends at various intervals up to one hundred million years into the future.

Episodes

Series overview

Special (2008)

Season 1 (2009)

Season 2 (2010)

Home media
A&E Home Video has released these DVDs:

That of the original documentary:
Title: Life After People (History Channel).
UPC: 733961110906.
DVD Release Date: March 18, 2008.
Run Time: 94 minutes.

That of the first season of the series:
Title: Life After People: The Complete Season One.
UPC: 733961155303.
DVD Release Date: October 27, 2009.
Run Time: 470 minutes.

That of the second season of the series:
Title: Life After People: The Complete Season Two.
UPC: 733961221626.
DVD Release Date: July 27, 2010.
Run Time: 425 minutes.

Ratings
The two-hour special documentary had an audience of 5.4 million viewers and was the most watched program ever on the History Channel. The program was broadcast in the United Kingdom on Channel 4 and narrated by Struan Rodger on May 29, 2008 and in Australia on Channel Seven on November 25, 2008, edited down to air for 90 minutes and included additional footage of a decaying Sydney Harbour Bridge, with narration by Australian television presenter Simon Reeve.

See also
10 Ways to End the World
Aftermath (TV series), a similar TV series
Aftermath: Population Zero (special, preceding above series)
The World Without Us
The Future is Wild
After Man

References

External links
 
  of production company
 Australian website
 Channel 4 (UK) website
  (original documentary)
  (series)

2008 American television series debuts
2009 American television series debuts
2010 American television series endings
Channel 4 original programming
Documentary films about environmental issues
Ecological restoration
English-language television shows
History (American TV channel) original programming
Documentary television series about science
Urban decay
Thought experiments
Human extinction
Documentary television shows about evolution